is a former Japanese football player.

Club statistics

References

External links

jsgoal

1983 births
Living people
Chukyo University alumni
Association football people from Aichi Prefecture
Japanese footballers
J1 League players
Japan Football League players
Ventforet Kofu players
FC Gifu players
FC Kariya players
Association football defenders